Cotalpa ashleyae is a beetle of the family Scarabaeidae.

References 

Rutelinae